Jordanco Davitkov (born 12 September 1963 in Kočani) is a former coach of the Macedonian National Basketball Team, and the Kuwait national basketball team. In 2011 on Gulf Games in Bahrain, with Kuwait National Team, won bronze medal. In 2009, 2010, 2011, three times in a row Davitkov was the Champion of Kuwait with BC Qadsia. With Qadsia also won Cup of Kuwait 2010 and Gulf Championship 2009! 2008- Head Coach of BC Snaefell_ Iceland.Since 2001 until 2007 Davitkov was Head coach of Macedonian National Team. He led Macedonia in the qualifying for the European Championships in 2003, as well as when Macedonia was in Second European Division in 2004 and 2005, and during the first phase of the qualifying for the European Championships in Spain 2007. Since 2000 until 2008 he was Head coach of KK Nikol Fert, KK Strumica 2005, Balkan Steel Skopje, and the best Macedonian team KK Rabotnicki. As a coach he had won four Championship titles and four Cup titles in Macedonia. Three times( 2004, 2005, 2006) he was announced as a best basketball coach in Macedonia. Twenty years he was professional player(18 years in the best Macedonian club "Rabotnicki". In this time he won  seven Championship Titles and five Cup titles. He has played for Young Yugoslavian National Team and he was the first captain of The Macedonian National Team.

In May 2008, he was hired as the head coach of Úrvalsdeild karla club Snæfell. After guiding the team during the Company Cup he, along with the foreign players of the club, were released in early October due to the club's financial situation in the wake of the 2008 Icelandic financial crisis.

References
 Eurobasket Profile
 http://www.asia-basket.com/Kuwait/basketball.asp?NewsID=241132
 http://www.basketball.org.mk
 https://web.archive.org/web/20120428060333/http://www.globalsportsplaza.com/coaches.asp?det=1&id=71
 http://stykkisholmsposturinn.is/?i=9&f=5&o=1445
 http://www.fiba.com/pages/eng/fe/10/fwcm/news/p/eid/6232/lid//nid/48921/rid//sid/7915/article.html
 http://www.one.mk/en/default.aspx?pArtID=576&pos=2
 https://twitter.com/Makbasket/status/126576138289033216
 https://www.facebook.com/pages/PMA-Basketball/109099412492768
 http://www.fiba.com/pages/eng/fc/expe/coac/fibaCertCoac/p/eventid//langlc/en/personnumber/18015/roundid//prof.html
 https://web.archive.org/web/20120120160058/http://results.bahrain11.net/ENG/ZZ/ZZS103A_BK@@@@@@@@@@@@@@@ENG.htm

Footnotes

1963 births
Living people
People from Kočani
Macedonian men's basketball players
Snæfell men's basketball coaches
Guards (basketball)